Dilbar Mat (Balochi:دلبر مت) is town and union council of Dera Bugti District in the Balochistan province of Pakistan. It has an altitude of 250 metres (823 feet).

The town is known for a military operation in 2016, where 19 civilians were kidnapped and 1 was killed.
As per reports, an armed group of insurgents ambushed a post of peace force in Dilbar Mat of Gandoi, some 30 km west of Sui town and killed one tribesman and injured three others while kidnapped five militia men. However, later the insurgents also killed the kidnapped men and threw their bodies. Dilbar Mat satellite view.

References

Populated places in Dera Bugti District
Union councils of Balochistan, Pakistan